Supatá is a municipality and town of Colombia in the Gualivá Province, part of the department of Cundinamarca. Supatá borders the municipalities Pacho, Vergara, Subachoque, La Vega and San Francisco.

History and geography 
Before the arrival of the Spanish conquistadores in the central highlands of Colombia, the area around Supatá was inhabited by the Panche people. In Chibcha Supatá means "low and fertile land".

On the El Tablazo mountain, at an elevation of  within the boundaries of Supatá, there's a cave named Cueva Chía ("Chía Cave"). Chía was the Moon goddess of the Muisca who frequently invaded the territories of the Panche. It is said the people hid the treasures of Chía in this cave.

Economical activities 
The main economical activity of Supatá is agriculture, particularly coffee, sugar cane, bananas and yuca.

Gallery

Named after Supatá 
 Supatá golden frog, a species of poisonous frog, found in the vicinity of Supatá has been named after the village

References 

Municipalities of Cundinamarca Department
Populated places established in 1882
1882 establishments in Colombia
Muysccubun